Writer's Digest is an American magazine aimed at beginning and established writers.  It contains interviews, market listings, calls for manuscripts, and how-to articles.

History

Writer's Digest was first published in December 1920 under the name Successful Writing. It changed name to Writer's Digest with the March 1921 issue. By the late 1920s, it shifted emphasis more from literary-quality writing to the rapidly growing pulp magazine field, which offered the widest opportunities to freelance writers. Its most important competitor was The Author & Journalist. An important feature in WD from 1933 forward was the New York Market Letter, edited by Harriet Bradfield, which gave timely updates on editor needs in the magazine field. As the pulp field collapsed in the 1950s, Writer's Digest shifted emphasis to famous writers and quality fiction.

Until 2019, it was owned by F+W Media. The magazine is published eight times per year.

F+W Media, facing near-term liquidity issues with only about $2.5 million in cash available and $105.2 million in outstanding debt, filed on 10 Mar 2019  for protection under Chapter 11 of the federal bankruptcy code, citing in various documents a perfect storm of secular industry decline, poor investments, and even mismanagement.
Apparently their attempts to transition focus to online from print sales was poorly done.  Their users forum had not worked well for some time,  and the number of users had dropped way down from previous times.

Writer's Digest was bought by the Active Interest Media subsidiary of Cruz Bay Publishing  and/or  PRH  (Penguin Random House) after bankruptcy of F+W, according to various sources. Penguin Random House acquired the book publishing assets of F+W Media, which include the Writer's Digest catalog. Cruz Bay got several magazines from F+W, including Writer's Digest, for $200,000, beating out enthusiast publisher Madavor Media.

Writer's Digest also sponsors several in-house contests annually, including the Writer's Digest International Self-Published Book Awards and their Annual Writing Competition for short stories.

Writer's Digest partnered with book publisher BookBaby, the sister company of CD Baby, in August 2014, to create a self-publishing division called Blue Ash Publishing, to provide instruction and education alongside book publishing and printing services. Blue Ash Publishing takes its name from the home office of the Writer’s Digest editorial team located in Blue Ash, Ohio.

Paid circulation 63000 per 2017 media kit, down from 69000 in the 2016 media kit.

See also 
 Writer's Market
 Writer's Digest Short Story Contest
 The Author & Journalist

References

External links 
 Writer's Digest magazine
 Writers Online Workshop, from Writer's Digest magazine
 Writer's Digest Writing Conference, from Writer's Digest magazine
 Blue Ash Publishing

Eight times annually magazines published in the United States
Literary magazines published in the United States
Magazines established in 1920
Magazines published in Cincinnati
Self-publishing